William Henry Thompson (18 January 1866 – 28 September 1920) was an English cricketer. Thompson's batting and bowling styles are unknown. He was born at Padiham, Lancashire.

Educated at Uppingham School, Thompson made a single first-class appearance for Liverpool and District against Yorkshire in 1892 at Aigburth Cricket Ground, Liverpool. In a match which Liverpool and District won by 6 wickets, Thompson batted once, scoring 10 runs in Liverpool and District's first-innings before he was dismissed by Louis Hall, while with the ball he took a single wicket, that of Thomas Wardall in Yorkshire's second-innings.

He died at Southport, Lancashire on 28 September 1920.

References

External links
William Thompson at ESPNcricinfo
William Thompson at CricketArchive

1866 births
1920 deaths
People from Padiham
People educated at Uppingham School
English cricketers
Liverpool and District cricketers